TACL (Tandem Advanced Command Language) is the scripting programming language which acts as the shell in Tandem Computers.

History
Tandem computers were originally designed and sold by Tandem Computers, Inc., based in Cupertino, CA. These were the first commercially available parallel processing computers. Despite their ability to expand to large sizes using parallelism, later to be called clustering, they were in the category of "mini-computers". Tandem's strategy was the emerging concept of "continuous availability" for applications requiring near-total uptime, in which single points of failure were minimized through mirrored storage devices, controllers and software, and operating systems engineered specifically for fault tolerance (using the Guardian operating system, later NonStop Kernel or NSK, and later NonStop OS). In computing, a single point of failure refers to any scenario in which the failure of a single component, application or process could result in broader impacts such as data loss or the cascading failure of the system. The relative likelihood of multiple component or process failures within a short time is considered much lower than the likelihood a single failure.

Tandem Computers, Inc. was acquired by Compaq Computer Corporation in 1997; and Compaq Computer Corp. was subsequently purchased by Hewlett-Packard in 2001. Today they are known as "HPE Nonstop", with products such as the HP Integrity NonStop Blade systems.

In 2022, HPE NonStop platforms underpin many of the largest banks, casinos, retailers, telephone companies, email systems, and stock exchanges worldwide. TACL continues to be the scripting language used on NonStop Servers.

Design philosophy

Many high-uptime computer systems that were produced after the Tandem NonStop platform rely on a pair of concurrently running, parallel but independent processes.  A "failover" scheme ensures that the secondary process (or hot backup) continues operating in the event of a failure in the primary process, thereby ensuring that any failure in the primary process does not result in a total failure of the function, network or system it supports. 

The Tandem NonStop design philosophy differs as each CPU performs its own work and may contain a dormant "backup" process in another CPU. Each pair of CPUs share hardware ownership of controllers and disk drives. Writes to the mirrored disk pair are performed on both the primary and backup drives. However, the drives are not truly redundant as reads will only be performed by the drive that can most quickly access the data, not both. If one CPU in the pair fails, the other will take full ownership of the disk drives and tasks it was undertaking, providing continuous availability to that data and continuous operation of the system, including re-driving disk I/Os. A running primary process may be given a backup process in another CPU, which receives checkpoint information. If the primary process fails, the backup process resumes the transaction using the checkpoint information. The backup process may also spawn its own backup to avoid data loss in case there are further failures. 

The name "NonStop" refers to this fault-tolerant design. HPE NonStop systems can support operations involving high transactions-per-second and are therefore used in critical applications such as banking, stock trading platforms and telecommunications systems.

Upon the NonStop OS platform there are at least two programming languages—TAL (Transaction Application Language) as the compiled language, and TACL as the interpreted language. NonStop OS software includes compilers for other languages (including Java, C, C++, COBOL, SCOBOL, etc.), which may be used to support functions in languages other than TAL/TACL if required. TACL remains as the default scripting language on these machines. HPE later introduced a ksh-based shell command interface, however this does not contain every capability offered by TACL such as the netstat command. TACL built-ins reflect the multi-CPU nature of NSK.

TACL instructions can be stored in a simple text file as MACROS, ROUTINES, or DEFINES which the TACL interpreter can execute as scripts. Such scripts are often used to store complex configuration instructions such as start-up and hardware configuration sequences. TACL is also used as a job control language for batch jobs.

The TACL language has a large number of built-in utilities which allow the user to capture and parse output from various system utilities. This allows users to build TACL programs that can monitor system events through the use of filters that monitor the system and application event logs.

Example uses of TACL

A TACL routine saved in the file FILE1
Create the following subroutine in the file FILE1:
 ?Section HELLO_BERNARD ROUTINE
 #OUTPUT Hello BERNARD

How to run the TACL routine:
 From a TACL prompt type: LOAD / KEEP 1 / FILE1 (this loads the routine into memory)
 Type: HELLO_BERNARD (this runs the routine)
 Output will be: Hello BERNARD

TACL code in the file FILE1
An alternate strategy is to create a file named FILE1 and add the following two lines:
 ?TACL ROUTINE
 #OUTPUT Hello BERNARD

Execute the routine by naming the file at the TACL prompt:
 > RUN FILE1'''

References

Further reading

External links
 NonStop G Series

Scripting languages